The 2006–07 TFF Third League is the 2006–07 season of Turkish Third League.

Standings

Group 1

Group 2

Note: In this group, 1 team is relegated to Amateur leagues due to DÇ. Divriğispor had accident while going to Gümüşhanespor away match and some players were injured in Round 21, so that their matched were awarded 3-0 for their rivals and DÇ. Divriğispor remained to Fourth Level.

Group 3

Group 4

First two teams of each group directly promoted to Iddaa League B. 3rd and 4th teams of each group played Promotion Play-Off matches. Last two teams of each group, except DÇ. Divriğispor, relegated to Amateur leagues. Lüleburgazspor, Bingöl Belediyespor, Tavşanlı Linyitspor, Kocaeli Körfez Belediyespor, Torbalı Belediyespor, Konya Şekerspor, Bafra Belediyespor (Bafraspor's new name since 1999) and Malatya Belediyespor promoted to Third League.

Extra Play-off matches:

All matches were played in Cebeci Stadium in Ankara:

Semifinals:

May 7

Aksarayspor - Aliağa Belediyespor: 1-6
Değirmenderespor - Bursa Merinosspor: 2-1

May 8

Bulancakspor - Alibeyköyspor: 1-2

May 23

Gölcükspor - Mersin Büyükşehir Belediyespor: 1-1 (Penalty: 4-2, Total: 5-3)

Finals:

May 9

Değirmenderespor - Aliağa Belediyespor: 1-1 (Penalty: 4-3, Total: 5-4)

May 29

Alibeyköyspor - Gölcükspor: 4-3

Değirmenderespor and Alibeyköyspor also promoted to Third Level or Iddaa League B.

Note: Referee of Gölcükspor - Mersin Büyükşehir Belediyespor match declared winner as Gölcükspor without shooting 4th penalty
kick of Gölcükspor, penalty score was 3-2 on May 8. TFF declared continuing penalty kicks from remained place on May 10 due to Mersin BŞB's objection. However Mersin Büyükşehir Belediyespor didn't field on May 10, so that Gölcükspor is declared win-
ner of the match by TFF. However, after Mersin Büyükşehir Belediyespor's objection, TFF insisted its decision on May 10.

See also
2006–07 Süper Lig
2006–07 TFF First League
2006–07 TFF Second League

TFF Third League seasons
Turk
4